The 1911–12 Kansas Jayhawks men's basketball team represented the University of Kansas during the 1911–12 college men's basketball season, which was their 14th season. They were coached by W. O. Hamilton who was in his 3rd year as head coach. They were members of the MVIAA. They won their fifth consecutive conference championship after finishing the season 11–7.

Roster
Walter Boehm
Loren Brown
Donald Dousman
Charles Greenless
Ora Hite
George Stuckey

Schedule and results
This schedule is incomplete.

References

Kansas
Kansas Jayhawks men's basketball seasons
Kansas Jayhawks Men's Basketball Team
Kansas Jayhawks Men's Basketball Team